Eupithecia lafontaineata is a moth in the family Geometridae. It is found in North America, including Alberta, California, Montana and Wyoming.

The wingspan is about 16 mm. Adults have been recorded on wing from June to July.

References

Moths described in 1990
lafontaineata
Moths of North America